Dobrova is a settlement in the City Municipality of Celje in eastern Slovenia. It lies on the northern outskirts of the town of Celje. The area is part of the traditional region of Styria. It is now included in the Savinja Statistical Region.

Name
The name of the settlement was changed from Zgornja Dobrova to Dobrova in 1982.

References

External links
Dobrova on Geopedia

Populated places in the City Municipality of Celje